Ladpura is a village in [Bhilwara] district of Rajasthan state in northwestern India, about 66.2 km east of Bhilwara and 97.2 km west of Kota.

Geography 
Ladpura is located at 26°30'5"N  and 74°23'31"E. It has an average elevation of 382 metres.

Demographics 
According to 2001 census total population of village was 2600. Males constitute 52% of the population and females 48%. Ladpura has an average literacy rate of 70%, higher than the national average of 60%: male literacy is 75%, and female literacy is 54%. In Ladpura, 15% of the population is under 6 years of age.

External links
Wikimapia link for Ladpura village

Villages in Nagaur district